TSV Trebgast is a German association football club from the town of Trebgast, Bavaria.

History
The club was established 1 July 1920 as the gymnastics club Turnverein Trebgast which quickly formed football, fistball and handball departments. Following World War II, TV joined two other local clubs to form ASV Trebgast before the club adopted their current name in 1950.

The footballers enjoyed their best seasons in the late 1970s when they played in the Amateurliga and Amateuroberliga Bayern following the capture of a title in the Landesliga Bayern-Nord in 1977. Their best result there came as a 7th place finish in 1978, before they slipped to 15th place in 1981 and were relegated. By 1991, the club dropped out of the Landesliga altogether. Their most recent success came as a second place finish in the Bezirksliga Oberfranken-Ost in 2002. TSV dropped as far as the A-Klasse Bayreuth (X) before promotion in 2015–16 took the club back up to the Kreisklasse.

In addition to the football side, the club has departments for Karate, hiking, women's gymnastics, shooting and carnival.

Honours
The club's honours:
 Landesliga Bayern-Nord
 Champions: 1977
 Runners-up: 1975
 Bezirksliga Oberfranken-Ost
 Champions: 1974
 Runners-up: 2002

Recent seasons
The recent season-by-season performance of the club:

With the introduction of the Bezirksoberligas in 1988 as the new fifth tier, below the Landesligas, all leagues below dropped one tier. With the introduction of the Regionalligas in 1994 and the 3. Liga in 2008 as the new third tier, below the 2. Bundesliga, all leagues below dropped one tier. With the establishment of the Regionalliga Bayern as the new fourth tier in Bavaria in 2012 the Bayernliga was split into a northern and a southern division, the number of Landesligas expanded from three to five and the Bezirksoberligas abolished. All leagues from the Bezirksligas onward were elevated one tier.

References

External links
Official team site 
 Das deutsche Fußball-Archiv historical German domestic league tables 
 Manfreds Fussball Archiv Tables and results from the Bavarian amateur leagues 

Football clubs in Germany
Football clubs in Bavaria
Association football clubs established in 1920
Football in Upper Franconia
1920 establishments in Germany
Kulmbach (district)